Russula pyriodora is a species of fungus in the family Russulaceae. Found in Finland, it was described as new to science in 2011 by Juhani Ruotsalainen. It associates mostly with birch (Betula spp.), but has also been recorded with alder (Alnus), spruce (Picea), and willow (Salix). Fruitbodies of the fungus resembles those of Russula betularum, but can be distinguished from that species by their distinctive pear odor. The holotype collection was made in the Kylmänpuro Nature Protection Area in August 2011. A rare species, the mushroom has usually been recorded in calcareous soil, beside brooks in forests.

See also
List of Russula species

References

External links

pyriodora
Fungi described in 2011
Fungi of Finland